Salem Township, Ohio may refer to:

Salem Township, Auglaize County, Ohio
Salem Township, Champaign County, Ohio
Salem Township, Columbiana County, Ohio
Salem Township, Highland County, Ohio
Salem Township, Jefferson County, Ohio
Salem Township, Meigs County, Ohio
Salem Township, Monroe County, Ohio
Salem Township, Muskingum County, Ohio
Salem Township, Ottawa County, Ohio
Salem Township, Shelby County, Ohio
Salem Township, Tuscarawas County, Ohio
Salem Township, Warren County, Ohio
Salem Township, Washington County, Ohio
Salem Township, Wyandot County, Ohio

Ohio township disambiguation pages